The Afghanistan senior men national volleyball team represents Afghanistan in international volleyball competitions and friendly matches.

Squad
Afghanistan national volleyball team 2022 
The squad is made up of 14 players and 3 coaches and manager.
head coach: mohammad asadollahi saraghein
assistant: mohammad sabir noori
assistant: nesar ahmad hanafi
team manager: mohammad nasir noori
naseer kohistani
gulam rasool haidari
ozair mohammad asefi
sayed habib yousufi
abdul malik mamoozai
lutfullah azizi
shafiqullah chaparhari
mohammad sabawoon wardak
mohammad imran niazai
besmallah sultani
adil shah zakeeri
abdulmutaleb mohammadi
abadullah pacha
sabawoon ghorzang

References

Volleyball
National men's volleyball teams
Volleyball in Afghanistan
Men's sport in Afghanistan